Kazanov is a Slavic masculine surname; its feminine counterpart is Kazanova, and it Latvian version is Kazanovs. It may refer to
Igors Kazanovs (born 1963), Latvian hurdler
Milko Kazanov (born 1970), Bulgarian sprint canoer
Sati Kazanova (born 1982), Russian singer, fashion model, actress and TV personality